Daniel Cassidy (15 June 1907 – 1995) was an English footballer who scored 15 goals from 165 appearances in the Football League playing for Darlington. He played at right half or on the right side of the forward line. He was also on the books of Southampton without representing that club in the league.

Cassidy scored the winning goal in the 1934 Football League Third Division North Cup Final as Darlington came back from a two-goal deficit to beat Stockport County 4–3 at Old Trafford, Manchester. According to the Manchester Guardians report,

His father, also named Daniel Cassidy, was a shipyard labourer born in Derry, Ireland.

References

1907 births
1995 deaths
Footballers from Gateshead
Association football wing halves
Association football forwards
Southampton F.C. players
Darlington F.C. players
English Football League players
English footballers
English people of Irish descent